Joey Yung (born 16 June 1980) is a Hong Kong singer and Cantopop diva signed to Emperor Entertainment Group.

Since her debut in 1996, Yung has won numerous awards, including the JSG Most Popular Female Singer and Ultimate Best Female Singer – Gold awards a record-breaking nine times. She was ranked 63rd on the 2014 Forbes China Celebrity 100, making her the most influential Hong Kong-based female singer that year. In 2014, she reportedly earned HK$80 million (US$10.3 million).

Early life
Yung was born on 16 June 1980 at Yan Chai Hospital in Tsuen Wan elder to one brother. She has ancestral roots from Xinhui, Guangdong. She attended Ma On Shan Lutheran Primary School, where she was classmates with Wong Cho-lam in her sixth grade.

At the age of fifteen, Yung competed in the Big Echo Karaoke Singing Contest and was subsequently signed by Go East Entertainment Co., Ltd. As an artist under Go East, she recorded the song "The First Time I Want to be Drunk" as a theme song for a film but did not gain much recognition and was dropped by the label not long after.

She continued to attend school while working as a clerk and helping her mother manage a fashion boutique. Later, an ex-colleague from Go East introduced her to Pony Canyon. However, not long after she joined the company, Pony Canyon shut down its Hong Kong branch.

Career

1998–1999: Debut 
In 1998, Yung signed with the Hong Kong record label Fitto Entertainment. In 1999, she was sent abroad for training and began to receive singing lessons from Teresa Carpio and Roman Tam, whom she accompanied on concert tours to gain experience as a performer. By that point, she had graduated from the Hong Kong Institute of Vocational Education with a diploma in tourism.

On 30 September 1999, she released her debut EP, EP 1 Joey. It sold 130,000 copies in Hong Kong and remained on the IFPI Album Charts for 2.3 weeks.

2000–2009 
In February 2000, Yung's apartment in Happy Valley was destroyed in a fire. That year, she made her first film appearance in Winner Takes All and her first television drama appearance in The Green Hope. She also released her second EP, titled EP 2 Can't Afford to Miss, and her first studio album, Who Will Love Me. At the same time, she fronted campaigns for several brands including Four Seas, the Red Cross, and Netvigator, and held her first concert, Joey Yung's 'See You Everywhere' Live Concert, at the Hong Kong Coliseum.

In 2001, Yung released her first compilation album Love Joey, which became the best-selling album of the year, followed by two Cantonese albums, All Summer Holiday and Solemn on Stage. In November, she held her second live concert and first concert series, H2O+ 'Solemn on Stage' Joey Yung Live in Concert 2001 at the Hong Kong Coliseum. She launched her singing career in Taiwan with the release of her first Mandarin album Honestly.

In 2002, she traveled abroad for two months to undergo dancing lessons, returning to Hong Kong to release the Cantonese album Something About You. She then became the spokesperson of Nissin and Nikon. On 11 October, she released the Mandarin album One Person's Love Song, and at the end of the year, she released her second compilation album, Love Joey 2.

In 2003, Yung's became well known for the song "My Pride" (我的驕傲) (the theme song of the TV commercial for Banyan Garden developed by Cheung Kong Holdings), released on 25 March on the album of the same name. That year, she became the spokesperson of a slimming parlour, losing some baby fat and presenting a new image. She released the album Show Up! on 30 September and held her third concert, Show Up! Live at the Hong Kong Coliseum. On 17 December, she released the Mandarin album Sola Portrait (獨照). At the end of the year, she dominated all the major Hong Kong music awards ceremonies, winning a handful of prestigious awards, including the JSG Most Popular Female Singer award and the Gold Song-Gold award (金曲金獎) at the JSG Best Ten Music Awards Presentation for "My Pride." She also won her first Best Female Singer-Gold award at the CRHK Music Awards, becoming the award's youngest ever recipient, and the Media Award for the artist who had accumulated the most awards from the four music award ceremonies in Hong Kong. Following this, she began the Show Up World Tour, which included dates in Canada, Australia, the United States, Mainland China, Macau, and Malaysia.

In 2004, Yung released the studio album Nin9 2 5ive and her first photo album The Real Joey, Glamour in London. The photo album was well received by the public and sold out shortly after its release. Her second album in 2004, Give Love a Break, was also a commercial success, breaking the platinum mark with pre-orders alone. At the end of the year, Yung released a Cantonese cover of "Chihuahua" (a song previously released in English by DJ BoBo) as part of a Coca-Cola advertising campaign in Hong Kong. At the year-end music awards, she won over 20 awards and received the highest honour award again, the Media Award. It was estimated that for 2004, her income was HK$60 million, including her income from endorsements alone, amounting to HK$10 million.

In 2005, Yung released her third compilation album, Love Joey 3, as well as a new Cantonese studio album, Bi-Heart. Her fourth major concert, Reflection of Joey's Live Concert, spanned eight days in October and November. The concert's theme song, "好事多為", was mixed and re-arranged in South Korea, resulting in the "好事多為 Reflection Mix". EEG was sponsored by Sony Ericsson for the theme song's music video. Following the success of the concert, its CD/VCD/DVD was certified triple platinum, selling 120,000 copies, and Yung's album sales surpassed five million worldwide, an impressive feat in the Cantopop industry (in which an average album will sell around 100,000 copies). However, Yung suffered from strained vocal cords and had to work for several days without talking in an effort to relax her vocal cords. She also spent several days receiving remedial acupuncture treatment in Nanjing and took singing lessons under vocal coach Christine Samson, known for teaching corrective singing techniques to many Cantopop singers. That year, she purchased two connecting flats named The Legend at Jardine's Lookout, Hong Kong, for HK$40 million.

On 27 February 2006, Yung released her tenth Cantonese studio album, Ten Most Wanted. According to Yung, the album was more experimental and had higher production values than her previous albums. She worked with Mavis Fan for two songs on the album; "Get Fit with Jane Fonda" and "Torn Tongue", both of which had lyrics by Yiu Fai Chow. On 21 July, she released a Mandarin album, Jump Up – 9492.

At the end of 2006, Yung released the Cantonese album Close Up to commercial success, selling out at stores over Hong Kong as well as online CD stores. A second version of the album was released on 26 January 2007, containing a bonus DVD with music videos for the songs "Splendid Encounter (華麗邂逅)" and "Elated Heart (心花怒放)". Around the same time, Yung held a concert organised by Neway with appearances from other artists such as Anthony Wong, at17, Hins Cheung, Yumiko Cheng, Vincent Wong, and Sun Boy'z.

In 2007, she became Hong Kong's ambassador of the World Vision 30 Hour Famine campaign and visited Kenya in March. On 5 July, she released her fifth Mandarin album, Insignificant Me, with the title track produced by Jay Chou. It was one of her worst selling Mandarin albums. On 7 July, she performed at the Live Earth concert in Shanghai. On 7 November, she released another album, Glow.

In early 2008, Yung released her fourth compilation album Love Joey 4 and held her fifth concert titled StarLight Live over ten days at the Hong Kong Coliseum. During the concert, she performed "The Power Medley", a 20-minute intense dance medley of her fast-tempo tracks. The concert's success led to a four-night extension. In February, Yung travelled to New York City with the hope of improving her dancing skills. That year she sang a number of official songs for the 2008 Beijing Olympics and began a world tour shortly afterwards with shows in Malaysia, Canada, the United States, Mainland China, Singapore, and Macau.

The year 2009 marked the tenth anniversary of Yung's career with EEG. To celebrate the occasion, two albums (A Time For Us and Very Busy) and a documentary were released, and a mini-concert (Perfect Ten Live at the Hong Kong Cultural Centre's Grand Theatre, where Yung won her first major singing contest in 1995) was held on 4 October, with tickets for the two shows selling out within seven minutes. The Perfect Ten Live Boxset was released in two versions in December: the standard version included two concert DVDs, the Perfect 10 documentary, and a photo album, while the deluxe version contained two more CDs from Perfect Ten Live and more photos. Towards the end of the year, Yung performed at the concert Music Is Live with Mobile Chan and won the Media Award for the third time (having previously won the award in 2003 and 2004).

2010–2019
On 29 January 2010, the 10th Anniversary EP titled Joey Ten was released together with the Joey Ten Boxset. The EP consisted of 10 different covers (9 for Version 1 and 1 for Version 2) and five songs. The Joey Ten Boxset included a photo album, stickers, a thank you card from Yung, a 'Chofy' bookmark, a comic book, a 'Chofy' USB, a DVD, and the new EP ('Chofy' is plush that represents Joey and the name is a combination of her Chinese name and Miffy). Three songs were promoted from the EP and all were charted at number one on three or more charts. In March, Yung concluded her StarLight Tour with two final shows in Sydney and Melbourne. On 20 August, she released another EP, EP2010, and in November she began her Number6 concert, which was her sixth major solo concert held at the Hong Kong Coliseum.

In 2011, Yung took a break for the first time since 2002 and travelled around the world. She stated that she would be focusing on the Mandarin-language market after the break, recording a new Mandarin album and carrying out promotions in Taiwan and Mainland China. On 26 April 2011, Yung became the first Chinese female singer to perform at London's Royal Albert Hall and t\e third Chinese singer overall, after her mentor Roman Tam in 1979 and Eason Chan in 2010. This was her first concert in Europe. On 23 September 2011, Yung released her 21st studio album, Joey & Joey. From the album, the song "13:00 (13點)" took the number one spot on three of the four major Hong Kong music charts, and the songs "The Tree with a Thousand Flowers (花千樹)" and "Wallpaper (牆紙)" were number ones on all four charts. Joey & Joey became the highest-selling local album of the year. Yung also starred in the film Diva, produced by Chapman To.

During the first half of 2012, she continued to tour with her Number 6 concert in Macau, Reno, Atlantic City, and Toronto. In July, she released her seventh Mandarin album Moment, from which she promoted the songs "Right Time (正好)", "Looking at Flowers Through the Fog (霧裏看花)", and "Increase Power (加大力度)". That year, she sang the theme song "Drama Series (連續劇)" for the TVB show The Hippocratic Crush and received a total of fourteen awards at the four major awards ceremonies.

In May 2013, Yung released her first single of the year, "View in a New Light (另眼相看)". On 29 June, she performed the last date of her Number6 world tour in Resorts Word Sentosa in Singapore. On 15 August, she released the album Little Day, which went 4× Platinum. She followed the album up with two compilation albums, the Hopelessly Romantic Collection (released 3 December) and the All Delicious Collection (released 20 December).

Between December 2013 and October 2015, she performed in the Ageas Joey Yung in Concert 1314 tour, beginning at the Hong Kong Coliseum and holding dates in China, Malaysia, and the United States. In 2014, Yung suffered another period where she lost her voice and had to take care of family illness. In 2015, Yung performed in concert with Hacken Lee, and she released the EP Me, re-do in April.

In 2016, Yung appeared alongside Hacken Lee on the Chinese television series I Am a Singer as the second substitute singer of the season and was eliminated before the second round of the finale.

Between 24 March and 15 April 2017, in a concert was on the drawing board for 6 years, Yung performed in My Secret Live in the Concert Hall of Hong Kong Academy for Performing Arts. It is a concert where all songs are non-promotional side-tracks from all her albums. The venue itself is also lesser known and smaller, as the total full attendance in the 17 shows combined would not amount to half the capacity of the Hong Kong Coliseum. On 31 October 2017, as Yung shifted her focus on commercial sponsorships and various ambassadorial work with Twins, she decided that she would not attend any music awards for the first time in her career in 2017/18 awards season, which was also due to her having no album releases or new works either as a singer or actress in 2017, meaning she would give up defending all her titles during the awards season.

On August 24, Joey Yung held the nineteenth “Pretty Crazy Joey Yung Concert Tour” at the Hong Kong Coliseum. Joey Yung invited many famous singers to the concert as guests, including Andy Lau, Leon Lai Ming, Jacky Cheung, JJ Lin, Nicholas Tse, Ekin Cheng, Jeff Chang, Louis Koo, Kenny Kwan, The Grasshopper, Julian Cheung, Leo Ku, Hacken Lee, etc.

2020–present: COVID-19 and onward 
Due to the pandemic, Yung spent most of her time from mid-2020 in China.

Yung released a Cantonese single in November 2020 entitled "Live in the Moment (東京人壽)". This also marked the first time Yung participated in the composition of a song she had co-written with Howie from Dear Jane. A special music video for the song was released in December with clips from the Pretty Crazy Tour. In February 2021, "Gone with the Flare (煙花紀)" was released. The song title was inspired by the lyrics of her 2009 hit song "In Search of Deities (搜神記)" from the album A Time for Us.

The Pretty Crazy Tour started on 25 January 2021 with two consecutive shows at The Venetian, Las Vegas. The third show was held in Atlantic City. In Europe, Yung performed in Hague, The Netherlands on 3 March 2020 and in London, England on 9 March 2020. With the declaration of the COVID-19 pandemic, the remaining shows in the world tour were either cancelled or postponed.

In January 2021, Yung joined the second season of the Chinese reality series Sisters Who Make Waves (season 2) which sees 30 women – all established artists in their own right – compete in various singing and dancing challenges weekly. Cecilia Cheung is also part of the line-up. Yung ranked 2nd during the initial evaluation stage in Episode 1. Yung subsequently led her team to victory for the third public performance. The fifth and final public performance took place in April 2021 and Yung emerged 4th overall in the final results, thus successfully debuting in a team.

Yung released a Chinese single, "So Fresh (featuring Dany Lee)," in August 2021. She joined The Masked Dancer (season 2) as a judge and participant. On 29 September 2021, she released a Cantonese single "After All These (不配)". She also directed the accompanying music video. During a live session, Yung also revealed that she would be releasing her first Cantonese studio album in 5 years by the end of 2021.

Personal life 
In June 2012, Wilfred Lau publicly announced their relationship which Yung subsequently confirmed. They broke up in 2018.

She has openly expressed a pro-establishment stance during the 2019-2020 Hong Kong Protests and was featured prominently in a video campaign by the People’s Daily to "oppose violence" and "rebuild Hong Kong."

In March 2021, Yung posted on Weibo, expressing her support for cotton made in Xinjiang, after companies suspended purchasing of cotton from there due to human rights concerns.

Discography

Cantonese studio albums:
 Joey EP (1999)
 Don't Miss EP (2000)
 Who Will Love Me (2000)
 All Summer Holiday (2001)
 Solemn on Stage (2001)
 Something About You (2002)
 My Pride (2003)
 Show Up! (2003)
 Nin9 2 5ive (2004)
 Give Love a Break (2004)
 Bi-Heart (2005)
 Ten Most Wanted (2006)
 Close Up (2006)
 Glow (2007)
 In Motion (2008)
 A Time for Us (2009)
 Joey Ten EP (2010)
 Airport EP (2010)
 Joey & Joey (2011)
 Little Day (2013)
 Me, re-do EP (2015)
 J-Pop (2016)
 Love in L.A. EP (2019)
 Schrodinger's Cat (2021)

Cantonese compilation albums:
 Love Joey (2001)
 Love Joey 2 (2002)
 Love Joey 3 (2005)
 Love Joey Love Four (2008)
 Hopelessly Romantic Collection (2013)
 All Delicious Collection (2013)

Cantonese singles:
 X'Mas Chihuahua (2004)

Mandarin studio albums:
 Honestly (2001)
 A Private Love Song (2002)
 Lonely Portrait (2003)
 Jump Up 9492 (2006)
 Little Little (2007)
 Very Busy (2009)
 Moment (2012)
 Searching For Answers (2018)

Mandarin compilation albums:
 A Hundred of Me (2016)

Filmography

Concerts

Concert Tours
 Show Up! Tour (2003–05)
 Reflection of Joey's Live Tour (2005–07)
 StarLight Tour (2008–10)
 Number 6 Tour (2010–12)
 1314 Tour (2013–15)
 Joey Yung & Hacken Lee Live Around the World (2015-2018)
 Pretty Crazy Joey Yung Concert Tour / Joey Yung The Tour: Love In (2019–)

Solo Concert Series 
 Joey Yung Live 2000 (~H2O+容祖兒美麗在望慈善演唱會) Joey Yung Live in Concert 2001 (~H2O + 容祖兒隆重登場演唱會2001) Neway Joey Yung Live Show Up (容祖兒演唱會2003) Sony Ericsson Reflection of Joey's Live (Sony Ericsson: Reflection of Joey's Live 容祖兒演唱會 2005) Johnnie Walker Keep Walking StarLight Joey Yung Live (StarLight 容祖兒演唱會08) Joey Yung Perfect 10 Live 2009 (容祖兒Perfect 10 黃金十年演唱會) Nokia Joey Yung Concert Number 6 2010 (諾基亞Nokia容祖兒演唱會第六回 2010) Ageas Joey Yung in Concert 1314 (富通保險: 1314容祖兒演唱會) Pretty Crazy Joey Yung Concert Tour (Pretty Crazy 容祖兒演唱會) Joey Yung The Tour: Love In (容祖兒巡迴演唱會)

Other concerts

Awards

See also

 Cantopop 
 Roman Tam

References

External links
 
 English Forum & Fansite
 Official FanClub Website
 

1980 births
Living people
Cantopop singers
20th-century Hong Kong women singers
Hong Kong film actresses
Hong Kong Mandopop singers
Hong Kong television actresses
21st-century Hong Kong women singers
Hong Kong idols